Penicillium onobense is an anamorph species in the genus Penicillium which was isolated from beech forest in Navarra in Spain.

References

Further reading 
 
 
 

onobense
Fungi described in 1981